John Stephen Butler (March 20, 1893 in Fall River, Kansas – April 29, 1967 in Seal Beach, California), was a professional baseball player who played shortstop from 1926 to 1929.

After his playing career ended, he was a coach for the Chicago White Sox in 1932 and managed in minor league baseball in 1931, 1933 and 1935.

External links

1893 births
1967 deaths
Major League Baseball shortstops
Brooklyn Robins players
St. Louis Cardinals players
Chicago Cubs players
Chicago White Sox coaches
Minor league baseball managers
Baseball players from Kansas
People from Greenwood County, Kansas
Tacoma Tigers players
Los Angeles Angels (minor league) players
Oakland Oaks (baseball) players
Salt Lake Bees players
Lincoln Links players
Wichita Jobbers players
Wichita Witches players
Wichita Izzies players
Minneapolis Millers (baseball) players
Toledo Mud Hens players
Denver Bears players
Des Moines Demons players